Alan Hounsell (born 8 February 1947) is a New Zealand former cricketer. He played first-class and List A cricket for Auckland, Canterbury, Northern Districts and Wellington between 1968 and 1977.

See also
 List of Auckland representative cricketers

References

External links
 

1947 births
Living people
New Zealand cricketers
Auckland cricketers
Canterbury cricketers
Northern Districts cricketers
Wellington cricketers
Cricketers from Christchurch
South Island cricketers